The Dance Awards is a national dance competition held annually in Las Vegas and Orlando. Dancers between the ages of five and nineteen are awarded to recognize excellence in dance. TDA is widely regarded as the most prestigious award presented for dance in the US, and is considered to be one of the toughest competitions internationally for young pre-professional dancers.

Overview 
The Dance Awards (TDA) is a national dance competition that collaborates with Jump, Nuvo, and 24 Seven dance, produced by Break the Floor. The Dance Awards was first held in 2011 in New York City, where it continued to be held annually in 2012 and 2013. In 2014, the competition expanded to two locations, Las Vegas and New York City. It continued to be held this way for another year in 2015. However, in 2016 and 2017, instead of New York City the second location was changed to Orlando.

The competition is usually held in the first week of July.

Famous competitors

There have been several competitors that have competed or appeared on several other talent or dancing shows such as America's Got Talent, World of Dance, Dance Moms, Dancing with the Stars, and So You Think You Can Dance. Those competitors include Jenna Johnson, Tanisha Belnap, Ricky Ubeda, Jonathan Wade, Justin Pham, Kalani Hilliker, Maesi Caes, Landon Anderson, Teddy Coffey, Rudy Abreu, Alexia Meyer, Kendyl Fay, Travis and Tyler Atwood, Nick Garcia, Taylor Sieve, Aaliyah Dixon, D'Angelo Castro, Amanda Carbajales, Briar Nolet, Gabe DeGuzman, Emma Sutherland, Ruby Castro, Tate McRae, Dylynn Jones,  Moises Parra, Addison Moffett, Sydney Tormey, Tristan Ianiero, Sophia Lucia, Brynn Rumfallo, Derek Piquette, Gracyn French, Tristen Sosa, Vivian Ruiz, Lex Ishimoto, Brianna Penrose, Ryan Maw, Joziah German, JoJo Siwa, Artyon Celestine, Riley Kurilko, Sage Rosen, Quinn Starner, Eva Igo, Gavin Morales, Avery Gay, Jay Jay Dixonbey, Izzy Howard, Logan Hernandez, Andres Penate, Murphy Lee, Parker Garrison, Maddie Ziegler, Ava Brooks, Brightyn Brems, Nick Daniels, Howard Johnson, Camila Schwarz, Crystal Huang, Diana Pombo, Hailey Bills, Jaxon Willard, Elliana Walmsley, Savannah Kristich, Brady Farrar, JT Church, Gino Cosculluela, Stephanie Sosa, Charity Anderson, Lauren Yakima, Kayla Mak, Findlay McConnell, Kaeli Ware, Ezra Sosa, Benjamin Castro, Shamus Moriarty, Rylee Arnold, Emma Hellenkamp, Ellie and Ava Wagner, Kiarra Waidelich, Easton Magliarditi, Mackenzie Ziegler, Jenna Valenzuela, Ella Horan, Holden Maples, Selena Hamilton, Dyllan Blackburn, Diego Pasillas, Kamri Peterson, Bostyn Brown, Jaycee Wilkins, Avery Hall, and Savannah Manzel.

New York City
New York City was the original location for the competition in 2011, but it was replaced by Orlando in 2016.

Studio of the Year Winners

Male Best Dancer Winners

Female Best Dancer winners

Las Vegas
Las Vegas was introduced as a location in 2014. It is widely considered to be the toughest place to compete as the most prestigious dance companies choose to attend the Las Vegas competition instead of the Orlando or New York City location.

Studio of the Year winners

Male Best Dancer winners

Female Best Dancer winners

Orlando
In 2016 Orlando replaced New York City as the second competition location.

Studio of the Year Winners

Male Best Dancer Winners

Female Best Dancer Winners

LIVE
The Dance Awards LIVE was held online in 2020 as a response to the COVID-19 pandemic.

Male Best Dancer Winners

Female Best Dancer Winners

Repeat Winners

Two Time Winners 
Avery Gay: Mini 2015, Junior 2017
Bostyn Brown: Junior 2016, Teen 2019
Cameron Voorhees: Mini 2018, Junior 2021
Crystal Huang: Mini 2019, Junior 2021
Emma Sutherland: Junior 2014, Teen 2016
Holden Maples: Junior 2016, Teen 2019
Hailey Bills: Mini 2017, Teen 2022
Ian Stegeman: Mini 2019, Junior 2021
Jazzmin James: Teen 2012, Senior 2015
Jonathan Paula: Mini 2016, Junior 2018
Jonathan Wade: Junior 2011, Senior 2016
Kayla Mak: Mini 2014, Senior 2021
Kelis Robinson: Teen 2018, Senior 2020
Kyle Patrick Clarke: Teen 2012, Senior 2015
Lex Ishimoto: Teen 2014, Senior 2016
Lucy Vallely: Teen 2015, Senior 2018
Morgan Higgins: Teen 2016, Senior 2018
Murphy Lee: Junior 2015, Teen 2019
Ruby Castro: Teen 2019, Senior 2022
Ricky Ubeda: Teen 2011, Senior 2012
Ryan Maw: Junior 2015, Teen 2017
Simrin Player: Teen 2014, Senior 2017
Stefania Bonomo: Mini 2017, Junior 2019
Tristan Ianero: Mini 2015, Junior 2017

Three Time Winners 

Brady Farrar: Mini 2014, Junior 2017, Teen 2021
D’Angelo Castro: Junior 2012, Teen 2016, Senior 2019
Findlay McConnell: Junior 2014, Teen 2017, Senior 2019
Jayci Kalb: Junior 2011, Teen 2014, Senior 2016
Joziah German: Mini 2014, Teen 2018, Senior 2020
Kiarra Waidelich: Mini 2016, Junior 2018, Teen 2020
Payton Johnson: Junior 2012, Teen 2015, Senior 2017
Tate McRae: Mini 2013, Junior 2015, Teen 2018

References

Dance competitions
Dance in the United States